Frouard is a commune in the Meurthe-et-Moselle department in the region of Grand Est, north-eastern France.  It is located 10 km north of Nancy near the confluence of the Moselle and Meurthe. It is noted for its Medieval mill; and was latterly a steel industry centre.  It is today mainly known as an inland port, and  rail/waterway node on the French Waterway Network.

Frouard is joined by a bridge to Pompey on the opposite bank of the Moselle.

Population

Astronomy
Minor planet 18635 Frouard is named after the town.

See also
 Communes of the Meurthe-et-Moselle department

References

Communes of Meurthe-et-Moselle